Don't Suppose is the debut solo album by the English singer Limahl (formerly and currently lead singer with the British band Kajagoogoo), released in 1984 by EMI Records.

Originally only released on vinyl album and cassette, the album was not released on compact disc until 2012 on the Gold Legion label, though several songs from the album had appeared on other albums. The compilation album The Best of Limahl features eight tracks from Don't Suppose, and the compilation Neverending Story—Best of Limahl features five tracks. The song "Tar Beach", which appears on neither of those albums, is featured on two joint compilations with Kajagoogoo. "The Greenhouse Effect" has never been officially released on compact disc. (Later editions of Don't Suppose replaced "The Greenhouse Effect" with "The NeverEnding Story".)

Editions
The album was released twice, in two slightly different editions. The second edition omitted "The Greenhouse Effect", which came at the end of side one; it was replaced with the hit single "The NeverEnding Story", from the soundtrack to the film The NeverEnding Story. The new track was composed by Tirolean producer Giorgio Moroder; Moroder also authored the instrumental B-side on the single release of "Ivory Tower", as well as most of the singer's second solo album, Colour All My Days. Limahl came to know Moroder while performing his song "Only for Love" at a rock festival in Tokyo; Moroder suggested that Limahl sing the movie's title song.

Music
With the exception of "The NeverEnding Story", Limahl composed the lyrics and music for the album himself. The original release was produced by Dave Harris and Tim Palmer; Palmer had previously collaborated with Kajagoogoo.  "The NeverEnding Story" had lyrics by Keith Forsey and was produced by Moroder. In a 1984 Japanese television interview, Limahl said that Don't Suppose saw him experimenting much more than he did on White Feathers, Kajagoogoo's debut album (which included "Too Shy"). Much of the record features a string section; flutes and saxophones also join Limahl's keyboards.

Title
Limahl explained that the title, Don't Suppose, was an invitation to the listener to personally verify the value of his music, without supposing, assuming, or guessing.

Commercial performance
The album was moderately successful, although it was a commercial failure in the UK where it peaked at number 63 (much lower than Kajagoogoo's second album, released that same year, which peaked at number 35). In the US it did better, reaching No. 41.

Singles
The song "Only for Love", the first single released from the album, peaked at number 16 on the UK Singles Chart in late 1983. The B-side of the single, "O.T.T. (Over The Top)", was never released on an album; it was a studio version of "Over the Top", an a cappella track partially sung by Limahl with Nick Beggs during the concert filmed for the VHS and Laserdisc release of Kajagoogoo's White Feathers Tour. The original live version included only the first two verses; the single includes a third verse, a middle section, and a final chorus with a brief coda.

"Too Much Trouble" was the second release, though this failed to reach the UK Top 40.

The third single, "The NeverEnding Story", charted in 17 countries, reaching the top 5 in several and number one in Spain, Sweden and Norway. In Italy and Germany, the song reached the number-two position. In the US the song only reached number 17 in the Billboard Hot 100 chart. In France and other French-speaking countries, "The NeverEnding Story (L'histoire sans fin)", a French version of the song also sung by Limahl, was released instead.

The fourth single, "Tar Beach", was released only in Germany, with "The Greenhouse Effect (Live)" as its B-side.

CD releases
In March 2012, Gold Legion issued the album on CD in the US featuring remixes of "NeverEnding Story" and "Only For Love" as bonus tracks. On track 10 at 3:25, there is a flaw during the transfer...a digital stuttering in one of the instruments. In 2014, Parlophone reissued it in Warner Music's budget boxed set Original Album Series along with Colour All My Days and the three Kajagoogoo albums without bonus material.

The first eight tracks were digitised by Dutch budget label Disky Communications for inclusion on the compilation album The Best of Limahl, released in 1996.  That album omits the last two tracks of Don't Suppose: "Tar Beach" and "Oh Girl"; also missing is "The Greenhouse Effect", although "The NeverEnding Story" is included. The compilation was re-released in 2003.

In 2002, Disky released a reduced version of the compilation, Neverending Story—Best of Limahl, which included five songs from Don't Suppose.

Track listing

Personnel
Limahl - lead vocals, backing vocals, keyboards
Dave "De" Harris - guitar, keyboards, Fairlight CMI synthesizer, Fairlight programming
Martin Ditcham - percussion
Tim Palmer - additional Simmons
B. J. Cole - pedal steel guitar on "Tar Beach"
Gary Barnacle - flute on "Only For Love"
Andy Mackintosh - saxophone and flute on "I Was a Fool"; flute on "Tar Beach"
Dynamite - female backing vocals
Anne Dudley - string arrangements, conductor
Technical
Tim Palmer - engineer
Brian Aris - photography

Release details

References

External links
 Don't Suppose album
 Limahl Official British Website (in English)
 KajaFax - The Officially Approved Limahl & Kajagoogoo Community & Fan Club
 Unofficial Limahl & Kajagoogoo YouTube video archives
 HitParadeItalia

1984 debut albums
Limahl albums
Albums produced by Giorgio Moroder
Albums produced by Tim Palmer
EMI Records albums